Daniel Penno (1861 – July 25, 1924) was an American Negro league shortstop in the 1880s and 1890s.

A native of East Greenwich, Rhode Island, Penno made his Negro leagues debut in 1887 with the Boston Resolutes. He went on to play for several other teams, including the Cuban Giants in 1898. Penno died in New York, New York in 1924 at age 62 or 63.

References

External links
 and Seamheads

1861 births
1924 deaths
Date of birth missing
Cuban Giants players
20th-century African-American people